A CEK Machine is an abstract machine invented by Matthias Felleisen and Daniel P. Friedman. It is generally implemented as an interpreter for functional programming languages, but can also be used to implement simple imperative programming languages. A state in a CEK machine includes a control statement, environment and continuation. The control statement is the term being evaluated at that moment, the environment is (usually) a map from variable names to values, and the continuation stores another state, or a special halt case. It is a simplified form of another abstract machine called the SECD machine.

The CEK machine builds on the SECD machine by replacing the dump (call stack) with the more advanced continuation, and putting parameters directly into the environment, rather than pushing them on to the parameter stack first. Other modifications can be made which creates a whole family of related machines. For example, the CESK machine has the environment map variables to a pointer on the store, which is effectively a heap. This allows it to model mutable state better than the ordinary CEK machine. The CK machine has no environment, and can be used for simple calculi without variables.

Description 
A CEK machine can be created for any programming language so the term is often used vaguely. For example, a CEK machine could be created to interpret the lambda calculus. Its environment maps variables to closures and the continuations are either a halt, a continuation to evaluate an argument (ar), or a continuation to evaluate an application after evaluating a function (ap):

Representation of components 
Each component of the CEK machine has various representations. The control string is usually a term being evaluated, or sometimes, a line number. For example, a CEK machine evaluating the lambda calculus would use a lambda expression as a control string. The environment is almost always a map from variables to values, or in the case of CESK machines, variables to addresses in the store. The representation of the continuation varies. It often contains another environment as well as a continuation type, for example argument or application. It is sometimes a call stack, where each frame is the rest of the state, i.e. a control statement and an environment.

Related machines 
There are some other machines closely linked to the CEK machine.

CESK machine 
The CESK machine is another machine closely related to the CEK machine. The environment in a CESK machine maps variables to pointers, on a "store" (heap) hence the name "CESK". It can be used to model mutable state, for example the Λσ calculus described in the original paper. This makes it much more useful for interpreting imperative programming languages, rather than functional ones.

CS machine 
The CS machine contains just a control statement and a store. It is also described by the original paper. In an application, instead of putting variables into an environment it substitutes them with an address on the store and putting the value of the variable in that address. The continuation is not needed because it is lazily evaluated; it does not need to remember to evaluate an argument.

SECD machine 

The SECD machine was the machine that CEK machine was based on. It has a stack, environment, control statement and dump. The dump is a call stack, and is used instead of a continuation. The stack is used for passing parameters to functions. The control statement was written in postfix notation, and the machine had its own "programming language". A lambda calculus statement like this:

(M N)

would be written like this:

N:M:ap

where ap is a function that applies two abstractions together.

Origins 
On page 196 of "Control Operators, the SECD Machine, and the -Calculus",

and on page 4 of the technical report with the same name,

Matthias Felleisen and Daniel P. Friedman wrote "The [CEK]
machine is derived from Reynolds' extended interpreter IV.",
referring to John Reynolds's
Interpreter III in "Definitional Interpreters for Higher-Order Programming Languages".

Modern times 
The CEK machine, like the Krivine machine, does not only functionally corresponds to a meta-circular evaluator,

it also syntactically corresponds to the  calculus -- a calculus that uses explicit substitution -- with an applicative-order reduction strategy,

and likewise for the SECD machine.

References 

Abstract machines